Fernando Daniel Screpis (born 10 April 1979, in Buenos Aires, Argentina) is a retired professional footballer.

Club career 

Screpis signed a three-and-a-half-year deal with the Edinburgh club during a trial period in Austria in the summer of 2007, however it did not take effect until January 1, 2008, with Screpis agreeing to spend six months with Vladimir Romanov-sponsored FBK Kaunas before defecting to Scotland. On January 31, Hearts completed the signing of the Argentine midfielder, who made his first-team debut in the 3–0 win at Inverness. His first start for the club was in a 2–0 defeat to Kilmarnock FC. His future at Tynecastle was thrown into doubt in July 2008, as he was not included in Csaba Laszlo's provisional squad for the club's tour of Austria. The same evening he appeared as a trialist for Plymouth Argyle. Screpis revealed on July 21, 2008 that Hearts had cancelled his contract.

Screpis appeared as a trialist for MLS Seattle Sounders FC in Feb. 2009. However the American based team failed to sign him. Fernando Screpis then finally found a team in the summer of 2009, AO Agia Napa in Cyprus.

After leaving AO Agia Napa after just one season, Fernando moved back to his hometown of Argentina and is currently playing for Club Social y Deportivo Liniers.

External links
 Fernando Screpis at BDFA.com.ar 
  
 
   Profile at londonhearts.com
 

1979 births
Living people
Footballers from Buenos Aires
Argentine footballers
Argentine expatriate footballers
Club Atlético Huracán footballers
Defensores de Belgrano footballers
Talleres de Remedios de Escalada footballers
SD Ponferradina players
Heart of Midlothian F.C. players
C.D. ESPOLI footballers
Benevento Calcio players
FC Sion players
Inter Riviera Maya footballers
Ayia Napa FC players
Swiss Super League players
Scottish Premier League players
Cypriot Second Division players
Expatriate footballers in Ecuador
Expatriate footballers in Spain
Expatriate footballers in Cyprus
Expatriate footballers in Italy
Expatriate footballers in Switzerland
Expatriate footballers in Scotland
Argentine expatriate sportspeople in Italy
Argentine expatriate sportspeople in Spain
Argentine expatriate sportspeople in Scotland
Association football midfielders